The Porsche 944 is a sports car manufactured by German automobile manufacturer Porsche from 1982 until 1991. A front-engine, rear-wheel drive mid-level model based on the 924 platform, the 944 was available in coupé or cabriolet body styles, with either naturally aspirated or turbocharged engines. With over 163,000 cars produced, the 944 was the most successful sports car in Porsche's history until the introductions of the Boxster and 997 Carrera.

Extensive design revisions for the 1992 model year prompted Porsche to drop the 944 nameplate and rebrand the vehicle as the 968.

History

The 924 had originally been a project of VW-Porsche, a joint Porsche/Volkswagen company incorporated to develop and produce the 914 which was sold in Europe badged as both a Porsche and a Volkswagen. In 1972, a replacement for the Volkswagen version of the 914, code named EA-425 began development. The model was to be sold as an Audi as part of the VW-Audi-Porsche marketing arrangement. Porsche was to manufacture its own version of the car. At one point, Volkswagen head Rudolf Leidig declared the EX-425 was going to be a Volkswagen exclusively, thus denying Porsche's version of the 914's replacement. Although testing had begun in the Spring of 1974, Volkswagen cancelled the EX-425 program, the reason being significant financial losses due to declining sales and rising development costs for new vehicles as well as the departure of Leidig. The recently introduced Volkswagen Scirocco was expected to fill the sports coupé market segment and the unfinished project was handed over to Audi to serve as the replacement for the Audi 100.

The cancellation of the EX-425 program led Porsche to market an entry level car to replace the 912E, which was a US-only stop-gap model for 1976, and their version of the 914, which was discontinued in 1975. Porsche purchased the design and the finished development mule with a Bosch K-Jetronic mechanical fuel injection system from Volkswagen. The vehicle, dubbed the 924, received positive reviews, but was criticised by Porsche enthusiasts for its Audi-sourced 2.0 L engine. In 1979, Porsche introduced a Turbocharged version of the 924 to increase performance, but this model carried a high price. Rather than scrapping the model from its line-up, Porsche decided to develop the 944, as they had done with generations of the 911; although model numbers would change, the 924 would provide the basis for this new mid level model.

The prototype of this mid level model debuted at LeMans in 1981, an unusual strategy implemented by Porsche at the time. Called the 924 GTP LeMans, the car was based on the 924 Carrera GT LeMans that competed in the event prior to the GTP's introduction. The most noticeable change in the new race car was the departure from the Audi sourced 2.0 L inline-4 engine in favour of the 2.5 L engine developed by Porsche. The new engine was mounted at an angle of 45 degree to the right and utilised a dual overhead camshaft along with counter rotating balance shafts, an unusual feature for its time that provided better weight distribution and ensured smooth power delivery by eliminating inherent vibrations resulting in the engine lasting longer. The engine also utilised Bosch's prototype Motronic engine management system to control ignition timing, fuel injection and boost pressure. The new race car proved to be much more fuel efficient than its predecessor, stopping only 21 times in 24 hours for fuel. The 924 GTP managed seventh position overall behind the race winning 936 and a class win at the GTP+ 3.0 category in 1981 before being retired and stored in the Porsche museum. In 1982, Porsche debuted the production road legal version of the race car, called the 944. The car utilised many technologies its race bred sibling had used, including the balance shafts and the engine management system, but power was toned down for safety purposes.

Not typical in luxury sports cars, the four-cylinder engine was chosen for fuel efficiency and size, because it had to be fitted from below on the Neckarsulm production line. To overcome roughness caused by the unbalanced secondary forces that are typical of inline four-cylinder engines, Porsche included two counter-rotating balance shafts running at twice the engine speed. Invented in 1904 by British engineer Frederick Lanchester, and further developed and patented in 1975 by Mitsubishi Motors, balance shafts carry eccentric weights which produce inertial forces that balance out the unbalanced secondary forces, making a four-cylinder engine feel as smooth as a six-cylinder engine. Porsche spent some time trying to develop their own system, but when they realised that they could not improve on the system developed by Mitsubishi, they chose to pay the licensing fees rather than come up with a variation just different enough to circumvent the patent. The licensing fees were about US$7–8 per car, which translated to about US$100 for the consumer to pay. Revised bodywork with wider wheel arches, similar to that of the 924 Carrera GT, a fresh interior and upgrades to the braking and suspension systems rounded out the major changes.

Models

944

Porsche introduced the 944 for the 1982 model year. It was slightly faster (despite having a poorer drag coefficient), was better equipped and more refined than the 924; it had better handling and stopping power, and was more comfortable to drive. The factory-claimed a 0–97 km/h (60 mph) acceleration time of less than 9 seconds (8.3 seconds according to "Porsche the Ultimate Guide" By Scott Faragher). The car had a nearly even front to rear weight distribution (50.7% front/49.3% rear) courtesy of the rear transaxle balancing out the engine in the front. North American-market cars had bigger bumpers and the front bumper had a larger rubber portion, replacing the auxiliary lights as required by the North American laws.

In mid-1985, the 944 underwent its first significant changes, these included: new dashboard and door panels, embedded radio antenna, upgraded alternator (from 90 amp to 115 amp), increased oil sump capacity, new front and rear cast alloy control arms and semi-trailing arms, larger fuel tank, optional heated and powered seats, Porsche HiFi sound system, and revisions in the mounting of the transaxle to reduce noise and vibration. The front windshield was now a flush-mounted unit. The "cookie cutter" style wheels used in the early 944s were upgraded to new "phone dial" style wheels (Fuchs wheels remained an option).

For the 1987 model year, the 944 Motronic DME was updated, and an anti-lock braking system (ABS) and driver and front passenger airbags were introduced. The 944 Turbo was the first car to offer airbags as standard equipment; they were optional on other 944 models.

In addition to the increase in displacement, the new engine featured a siamesed-cylinder block design and a different cylinder head which incorporated larger valves.

Callaway 944
In 1983, American tuning company Callaway Cars began offering a turbocharged package for the US-Spec 944 in collaboration with Porsche. The standard 2.5 L inline-four engine was not suitable for forced induction because of the higher compression ratio of 9.5:1 which made the engine prone to failure when subject to forced induction along with the complex Bosch Motronic engine management system. Callaway engineers overcame this problem by increasing the volume of the engine's combustion chambers by milling away metal from both piston heads and chamber walls and by tweaking the Motronic system so it would ensure optimum fuel injection to the turbocharged engine along with installing their own Microfueler unit. This step was highly effective, but required disassembly of the entire engine, leading to the high cost of the package. The resulting engine's compression ratio was of 8.0:1 which was less than the standard engine but ensured linear power delivery. In order to ensure that there were no serious engine breakdowns, Callaway installed an ubiquous internal waste gate recommending the use of 91-octane fuel in order for increased engine reliability. In addition to that, an IHI RHB6 turbocharger was installed on the right hand side of the engine along with a new free flow exhaust system incorporating a larger exhaust pipe for optimum performance. The small turbocharger eliminated turbo-lag thus ensuring linear levels of boost. The turbocharger produced 10 psi of boost, however a boost adjuster knob located on the dashboard was optional. Callaway quoted that the acceleration times would even be lower if the rev limiter was removed. Only 20 cars were produced making it one of the rarest Porsche 944s produced.

944 Turbo (951 LHD/952 RHD)

For the 1986 model year, Porsche introduced the 944 Turbo, known internally as the 951. The Turbo had a turbocharged and intercooled version of the standard 944's engine that generated   ( in the US) at 6,000 rpm. In 1987, Car and Driver tested the 944 Turbo and achieved a  time of 5.9 seconds. The Turbo was the first Porsche production car utilising a ceramic port liner to retain exhaust gas temperature along with new forged pistons and was also the first vehicle to produce an identical power output with or without a catalytic converter. The Turbo also featured several other changes, such as improved aerodynamics, notably an integrated front bumper. This featured the widest turn signals (indicators) fitted to any production car, a strengthened gearbox with a different final drive ratio, standard external oil coolers for both the engine and transmission, standard 16 inch wheels (optional forged Fuchs wheels), and a slightly stiffer suspension (progressive springs) to handle the extra weight. The Turbo's front and rear brakes were borrowed from the 911, with Brembo 4-piston fixed calipers and 12-inch discs. Engine component revisions, more than thirty in all, were made to the 951 to compensate for increased internal loads and heat.

Changes occurred for the 1987 model year. The North American variant of the 1987 944 Turbo became the first production car in the world to be equipped with driver and passenger side air bags as standard equipment. A low oil level light was added to the dash as well as a  speedometer as opposed to the  speedometer on the 1986 model year cars. Also included was the deletion of the transmission oil cooler, and a change in suspension control arms to reduce the car's scrub radius. The engine remained the same M44/51 inline-4 as in the 1986 model. Like the standard 944, ABS now became an available option.

The 944 Turbo S' suspension had the "M030" option consisting of Koni adjustable shocks at the front and rear, with ride height adjusting threaded collars on the front struts, progressive rate springs, larger hollow rear anti-roll/torsion bars, harder durometer suspension bushings, larger  hollow anti-roll/torsion bars at the front, and chassis stiffening brackets in the front frame rails. The air conditioning dryer lines were routed so as to clear the front frame brace on the driver's side. The 944 Turbo S wheels, known as the Club Sport design, were 16-inch Fuchs forged and flat-dished, similar to the Design 90 wheel. The front and rear fender edges were rolled to accommodate the larger wheels. The manual transmission (case code designation: AOR) featured a higher friction clutch disc setup, an external cooler, and a limited-slip differential with a 40% lockup setting. The Turbo S' front brakes were borrowed from the 928 S4, with larger Brembo GT 4-piston fixed calipers and 12-inch discs; rear Brembo brakes remained the same as a standard Turbo. ABS also came standard.

The 944 Turbo S interior featured power seats for both driver and passenger, where the majority of the factory-built Turbo S models sported a "Burgundy plaid" (Silver Rose edition) interior colour but other interior/exterior colours were available. A 10-speaker sound system and equalizer + amp was a common option with the Turbo S and S/SE prototypes. Only the earlier 1986,  prototypes featured a "special wishes custom interior" options package.

In 1989 and later production years, the 'S' designation was dropped from the 944 Turbo S, and all of the turbocharged iterations of the 944 featured the Turbo S enhancements as standard, however the "M030" suspension and the Club Sport wheels were not part of that standard. The 944 Turbo S was the fastest production four cylinder car of its time.

944 S

For the 1987 model year, the 944 S (the S being the abbreviation of Super) was introduced. The 944 S featured a high performance naturally aspirated, dual-overhead-cam 16-valve  version of the 2.5 L engine (M44/40) featuring a self-adjusting timing belt tensioner. This marked the first use of four-valves-per-cylinder heads and DOHC in the 944, derived from the 928 S4 featuring a redesigned camshaft drive, a magnesium intake tract/passages, magnesium valve cover, larger capacity oil sump, and revised exhaust system. The alternator capacity was 115 amps. The wheel bearings were also strengthened and the brake servo action was made more powerful. Floating 944 calipers were standard, but the rear wheel brake circuit pressure regulator from the 944 turbo was used. Small '16 Ventiler' script badges were added on the sides in front of the body protection mouldings. Performance figures included 0- being achieved in 6.5 seconds (Best) and a  top speed due to a  curb weight. It also featured an improved programmed Bosch Digital Motronic 2.1 Computer/DME with dual knock sensors for improved fuel performance for the higher 10.9:1 compression ratio cylinder head. Like the 944 Turbo, the 944 S received progressive springs for improved handling, larger front and rear anti-roll bars, revised transmission and gearing to better suit the 2.5 L DOHC engine's higher 6,800 rpm rev limit. Dual air bags, limited-slip differential, and an anti-lock braking system were optional on the 944 S.

A Club Sport touring package (M637) was available as was the lightweight 16-inch CS/Sport Fuchs 16x7 and 16x9 forged alloy wheels. This version was raced in Canada, Europe and in the IMSA Firehawk Cup Series held in the U.S. Production was only during 1987 and 1988. It was superseded in 1989 by the 'S2' version. The 1987 944 S' power-to-weight ratio was such that it was able to accelerate from 0 to 100 km/h in 6.5 seconds thus matching the acceleration of its newer larger displacement 3.0 L 944 S2 sibling.

944 S2

In 1989 the 944 S2 was introduced, powered by a  naturally aspirated, dual-overhead-cam 16-valve 3.0 L version of the 944 S' engine. The 944 S2 also received a revised transmission and gearing to better suit the 3.0 L M44/41 powerplant. The 944 S2 had the same rounded nose and a rear valance found on the Turbo model. A Club Sport touring package (M637) was also available. Dual air bags (left hand drive models), limited-slip differential and ABS were optional. Design 90 16-inch cast alloy wheels were standard equipment.

944 S2 Cabriolet

The first Porsche 944 Cabriolet prototype was introduced at the Frankfurt Auto show in 1985.  This first prototype was styled by Anotele Lapine and built by Bauer.  This new Porsche 944 Cabriolet was very well received, but it wasn't until 1987 that the American Sunroof Corporation (ASC) won the contract to build the new model.  It would take another two years for ASC to complete their new Weinsberg plant in Heilbronn, Germany; before they could begin production.  So it was January 1989, before the new Porsche 944 S2 Cabriolet would begin to roll off ASC's assembly line.

The S2 Cabriolet was a very complicated build, where 944 coupe bodies were taken off the assembly line at Neckarsulm, Germany and then delivered to ASC in Heilbronn, Germany.  At ASC, structural steel reinforcement plates are welded in the front end of the car and floor pan area, to give the body the amount of torsional strength and crash safety required for a Cabriolet. After welding in these reinforcement plates, cuts are made in the body at the windshield frame, B pillars, rear side panels and tail panel, in preparation for coupe top removal. New parts to support the convertible top and the new rear deck lid are also welded in place. After the top is removed, the new Cabriolet body was sent back to Neckarsulm, where it is run through the standard production paint shop and assembly line for drive train install. Consequently, the structure of the paint finish and other corrosion inhibiting measures conform with the quality standards for Porsche and its new Cabriolet. The assembled Cabriolet was then sent back to ASC in Heilbronn for convertible top and trim installation. 
 
Production for the North American market would not start until May 1989, with only 16 of the 944 S2 Cabriolets being produced for the US market.  The VIN codes of these 16 cars for 1989 is unique, starting with WP0B, with the 4th character "B" signifying the body type for a Targa.  Porsche would correct this discrepancy and change the VIN codes for the 1990 model to WP0C, with the 4th character "C" signifying a Cabriolet.  The limited number of Cabriolets for 1989 went to only a handful of dealers and some were initially not for sale.  Many of these first year Cabriolets were provided to various auto magazine staff for road test and performance articles.  Others were used as advertising for reserving a 1990 model, with production growing to 1824 Cabriolets for the US market.  US production would fall to 562 Cabriolets for 1991, which would be its final year.  Only 2402 Porsche 944 S2 Cabriolets were imported into the US between 1989 and when the model was discontinued in 1991.  It would be replaced by the Porsche 968 Cabriolet for 1992.

944 Turbo Cabriolet

In February 1991, Porsche unveiled the 944 Turbo Cabriolet, which combined the Turbo S'  engine with the cabriolet body style also built by ASC. Porsche initially announced that 600 cars would be made; ultimately 625 were built, 100 of which were right-hand drive for the United Kingdom, Japanese, Australian, and South African markets. None were imported to the U.S. and The Americas.

End of production
In early 1990, Porsche engineers began working on what they had intended to be the third evolution of the 944, the S3. As they progressed with the development process, they realised that so many parts were being changed that they had produced an almost entirely new vehicle. Porsche consequently shifted development from the 944 S/S2 to the car that would replace the 944 entirely, the 968. The 944's final year of production was 1991 with over 4,000 cars built and sold. In 1992, the 968 debuted and was sold alongside the 928 until 1995, when both water-cooled front engine models were discontinued without a direct successor.

In February 1992, a verbal agreement was given to Porsche UK from Stuttgart for the production of a prototype “Sports Equipment” 944 S2 Model with following approval to construct 15 vehicles for the UK market from the last 944 S2 coupés produced. A unique 30mm lower fully adjustable Koni Suspension with springs from the Turbo was used in combination with upgraded 31mm front stabiliser bar & adjustable rear bar. Cosmetically the “SE” was fitted with Porsche colour matched “Porsche Sport” steering wheel, Bi-plane rear spoiler, SE side decals and rear badging. The modifications resulted in improved acceleration in higher rev range, flatter cornering, more precise steering, improved responsiveness, confidence inspiring handling leading to an overall sharper response. The 944 S2 SE prototypes are regarded as the inspiration and in part development for the later 968 Club Sport.

Production
A grand total 163,192 cars in the 944 family were produced between 1982 and 1991. This made it the most successful sports car in Porsche's history until the introduction of the Boxster/Cayman and 997 Carrera.

The successor to the 944 was the 968, which was introduced in the 1992 model year and was based on an evolution of the same front-engine, transaxle platform of the 944.

944
A total of 113,070 944s were made between 1982 and 1989, with 56,921 being exported to the United States. A project joint venture with Porsche and Callaway resulted in 20 specially built turbo 944's built for the US market in 1983.

944 Turbo (951/952)
A total of 25,245 944 Turbos were made, with 13,982 being exported to the United States.

 - Includes 12 Turbo S (951) / SE in UK (952), factory built prototypes of which 10 were exported to markets outside Germany.

 - Includes 1635 Turbo S 

† - Includes 251 Turbo Cabriolet. A different source, Jerry Sloniger's
article in the October 1991 issue of Excellence, indicates that the
factory built 525, of which 255 were exported to markets outside Germany.

< >"CUP" designates a cup car which is a special edition race car.

944 S
A total of 12,936 944 S models were produced from 1987 to 1988, with 8,815 being exported to the United States. In 1985 a Prototype 944 S Cabriolet 'Studie' built by Braun was powered by the 2.5 L 16 valve which developed 185 hp, forerunner of the later production 944 S and S2 Cabriolet models.
 

 - Includes CS - Club Sport's built for US, and ROW markets.

944 S2
A total of around 14,071 944 S2's were made between 1989 and 1991, with 3,650 being exported to the United States.

944 S2 Cabriolet 
Production of the 944 S2 Cabriolet began in May 1989, but official total production numbers for that first year and world market production are not well established.  The only production number listed for 944 S2 Cabriolets in 1989, are the 16 produced for the US market. Although there are several 1989 944 S2 Cabriolets still registered in the US, there is speculation that the original 16 produced for the US market in 1989 were initially not intended to be sold to the public.  
There are more than a few 1989 built/manufactured 944 S2 Cabriolets registered in the UK and Germany, both left and right hand drive.  
It is presumed that much of the world production for 1989 and 1990 stayed in Germany and the UK.
  
Total production for years 1990 and 1991 are well documented, as well as the 3 year total production for the US market of 2,402 units.

Motorsport

SCCA Production Class and Trans Am 
After numerous successes in Europe by both the Porsche factory team and privateers at Le Mans and various supporting races, the 924/944 platform was then introduced with relative success over in North America under the SCCA Production Class. In 1986, the Carlsen Racing 944 won the SCCA Escort Endurance Series Championship (S/S GT). The 1988 and 1989 SCCA GT2 titles were claimed the 944S driven by David Finch for the years 1988 and 1989. Heavily modified versions of the 944, some with a tube framed chassis that were built by Klym Fabcar in North America were run in the SCCA Trans Am championship, Initially these cars were run with the Audi sourced 2.0 litre engine but were dropped in favour of the Porsche 2.5 litre which was then tuned and upgraded to have an output of up to 750bhp by a company called ANDIAL

944 Turbo Cup 

Porsche began a race series for the top-of-the line 944 Turbo in the mid-1980s. There were five championship series: one in France, one in Germany, one in South Africa, one in Canada, and one in the United States. Each had a different number of cars competing. The Turbo Cup cars developed for the series had substantial upgrades over their road going counterparts. These included a larger KKK K26-8 turbocharger, a magnesium intake manifold and oil pan, a reinforced transmission, clutch, differential and axles along with removal of A/C, power seats, leather upholstery, sun visors, power windows, power steering, rear wiper, headlight washers, fender liners, storage pockets, and rear trunk release, upgraded struts, shocks, springs, suspension mounts, as well as an adjustable ABS system, bigger brakes with racing pads, magnesium wheels, a transmission oil cooler, and a lightweight battery. Cup cars are identified having the last 4 VIN digits from 1501 to 1700. As far as known only one left the factory as a cup car for a doctor in Germany with the specially ordered normal black leather interior, targa roof top and white body colour.

Awards
The 944 was on Car and Driver's Ten Best list from 1983 through 1985, and the Turbo made the list for 1986.

In 1984, Car and Driver named the 944 the Best Handling Production Car in America.

See also
944 Cup

References

Notes

Bibliography

General

 
 
 
 
 
 
 
 
 
 
 
 
 
 
 
 
 
 
 
 
 
Stuever, Hank. "Real Men Cant Hold a Match to Jake Ryan of 'Sixteen Candles.' Washington Post, February 14, 2004
 
 
 
Automobile, September 1987 Issue
Car and Driver, Dec. 1985 Issue

Workshop manuals

External links

Porsche 944 Turbo Historical Resource
Porsche 944 Turbo Resource
Porsche 944 Repair and Upgrades
Porsche 944 Repair Guides
Porsche 944 Turbo
Porsche 944 Turbo Cabriolet Registry

944
1990s cars
Rear-wheel-drive vehicles
Sports cars
Cars introduced in 1982
Cars discontinued in 1991